The 2020–21 Liga MX season  (known as the Liga BBVA MX for sponsorship reasons) was the 74th professional season of the top-flight football league in Mexico. The season was divided into two championships—the Torneo Guardianes 2020 and the Torneo Guardianes 2021—each in an identical format and each contested by the same eighteen teams. Both the Apertura 2020 and Clausura 2021 tournaments were renamed "Torneo Guardianes 2020" and "Torneo Guardianes 2021" (stylized as Guard1anes) to honor healthcare workers in the aftermath of the COVID-19 pandemic in Mexico. The Guardianes 2020 tournament began on 24 July 2020.

The season saw the debut of Mazatlán F.C., replacing Monarcas Morelia, who were relocated to Mazatlán, Sinaloa to become the new Mazatlán franchise, despite backlash from supporters, former players, and the sports media across Mexico. The season saw an expanded playoff system. Twelve teams qualified to the Liguilla instead of eight.

Teams

Stadiums and locations

Personnel and kits

Managerial changes

Torneo Guardianes 2020
The 2020 Torneo Guardianes was the first tournament of the season. The tournament was renamed Torneo Guardianes 2020 (stylized as Guard1anes) in honour of the job healthcare workers have done during the COVID-19 pandemic in Mexico. The tournament began on 24 July.

Standings

Positions by Round

Results 
Teams played every other team once (either at home or away), completing a total of 17 rounds.

Regular season statistics 
First goal of the season:  André-Pierre Gignac for Tigres UANL against Necaxa (25 July 2020)

Top goalscorers 
Players sorted first by goals scored, then by last name.

Source: Liga MX

Top assists 
Players sorted first by assists, then by last name.

Source: Soccerway

Hat tricks

Final phase – Guardianes 2020

Reclassification

Bracket

Quarter-finals

Semi-finals

Finals

Torneo Guardianes 2021
The Clausura tournament was named Guardianes 2021, in honour of the doctors and health professionals in the country who fight against COVID-19.

The Guardianes 2021 season began on 7 January 2021.

Standings

Positions by Round

Results 
Teams played every other team once (either at home or away), completing a total of 17 rounds.

Regular season statistics 

First goal of the season:  Santiago Ormeño for Puebla against Guadalajara (8 January 2021)

Top goalscorers 
Players sorted first by goals scored, then by last name.

Source: Liga MX

Top assists 
Players sorted first by assists, then by last name.

Source: Soccerway

Hat tricks

Attendance
Due to the COVID-19 pandemic in Mexico, the majority of matches in the beginning of the season were played behind closed doors. On 7 January 2021, Liga MX announced states that are green and yellow on the traffic light monitoring system have the authorization to allow fans in attendance at a reduced capacity. Mazatlán announced it would allow up to 7,575 fans in attendance (40% of stadium's capacity). On 12 January 2021, it was announced Necaxa would allow 30% capacity for their Week 2 match against Atlético San Luis. Due to a rise in cases in the state of Aguascalientes, Necaxa did not allow fans in attendance for their Week 5 and 7 matches but later allowed fans in Week 9. 

On 1 March 2021, state authorities of Jalisco authorized the opening of Atlas and Guadalajara's stadiums at 30% capacity. On 2 March 2021, Liga MX announced stadiums can be up to 50% capacity; the announcement came after various states' status went to yellow on the traffic light monitoring system. That same day, the state authorities of Chihuahua authorized FC Juárez to have fans in attendance, also at 30% capacity. As the season progressed, León, Pachuca, and Santos Laguna, were authorized to open their stadiums by their local Governments.

Per team

Source: Liga MX

Highest and lowest

Source: Liga MX

Final phase – Guardianes 2021

Reclassification

Bracket

Quarter-finals

Semi-finals

Finals

Coefficient table
As of the 2020–21 season, the promotion and relegation between Liga MX and Liga de Expansión MX (formerly known as Ascenso MX) was suspended, however, the coefficient table will be used to establish the payment of fines that will be used for the development of the clubs of the silver circuit. 

Per Article 24 of the competition regulations, the payment of $MXN240 million will be distributed among the last three positioned in the coefficient table as follows: 120 million in the last place; 70 million the penultimate; and 50 million will be paid by the sixteenth team in the table. 

The team that finishes last on the table will start the following season with a coefficient of zero. Due to the COVID-19 pandemic suspending the Clausura 2020 season, the points obtained in the 2020–21 season between matches not held in the Clausura 2020, will now count as double for the 2020–21 coefficient.

 Rules for fine payment: 1) Fine coefficient; 2) Goal difference; 3) Number of goals scored; 4) Head-to-head results between tied teams; 5) Number of goals scored away; 6) Fair Play points
 F = Team will have to pay fine indicated.
Source: Liga MX

Aggregate table 
The aggregate table (the sum of points of both the Guardianes 2020 and Guardianes 2021 tournaments) will be used to determine participants in the 2021 Leagues Cup.

Notes

See also 
2020 Copa por México
2020–21 Liga de Expansión MX season
2020–21 Liga MX Femenil season

References

External links
 Official website of Liga MX

 
Liga MX seasons
1